Pearl Hackney (28 October 1916 – 18 September 2009) was a British actress and the wife of comic actor Eric Barker. She was born in Burton upon Trent, Staffordshire, but spent much of her early life in Liverpool, Lancashire (now Merseyside).

As well as appearing with her husband in a number of productions including 21 episodes of The Eric Barker Half-Hour  her television credits also include Coronation Street, Are You Being Served? (as Mrs. Grainger, wife of Mr. Ernest Grainger, in one episode, "The Clock", 1974), The Famous Five and All Creatures Great and Small. She also appeared in various radio episodes of Dad's Army.

Her film appearances included Stand Up, Virgin Soldiers (1977), Yanks (1979), The Ploughman's Lunch (1983), and four films for British director Pete Walker: Cool It Carol! (1970), Four Dimensions of Greta (1972), Tiffany Jones (1973), and Schizo (1976).

Her stage appearances included the principal role of Parthy in a revival of the musical Show Boat at London's Adelphi Theatre in 1971.

She died in Herne Bay, Kent, on 18 September 2009, aged 92 and is buried with her husband in the churchyard of St. Mary's, Stalisfield Green.

Filmography

References

External links 
 

1916 births
2009 deaths
English stage actresses
English film actresses
English radio actresses
English television actresses
English soap opera actresses
People from Burton upon Trent
20th-century English actresses
Actresses from Liverpool
People from Stalisfield Green